H. T. Klugel Architectural Sheet Metal Work Building is a historic factory building located at Emporia, Virginia. It was built in 1914, and is a one-story, five bay wide, brick structure with stepped parapets on the sides.  The front facade is sheathed in decorative silver and black painted worked sheet metal in an Edwardian Classicism style.  It features large rounded arches with a fan tracery filling the top of the arch.  It also has a balustrade with pedestals capped by onion domes that top the east and west bays.

It was listed on the National Register of Historic Places in 1973. It is located in the Belfield-Emporia Historic District.

References

Industrial buildings and structures on the National Register of Historic Places in Virginia
Industrial buildings completed in 1914
Buildings and structures in Emporia, Virginia
National Register of Historic Places in Emporia, Virginia
Individually listed contributing properties to historic districts on the National Register in Virginia
Fabrication (metal)
1914 establishments in Virginia